The 1833 Morpeth by-election was held on 31 December 1833 It was won by the unopposed Whig candidate Edward George Granville Howard who replaced his brother Frederick George Howard.

References

By-elections to the Parliament of the United Kingdom in Northumberland constituencies
Unopposed by-elections to the Parliament of the United Kingdom in English constituencies
1833 in England
1833 elections in Europe
19th century in Northumberland
Morpeth, Northumberland
December 1833 events
1830s elections in the United Kingdom